The Afghan Interim Administration (AIA), also known as the Afghan Interim Authority, was the first administration of Afghanistan after the fall of the Taliban regime and was the highest authority of the country from 22 December 2001 until 13 July 2002.

Background
After the September 11 attacks, the United States launched a "Global War on Terrorism" as part of its Operation Enduring Freedom, to remove the Taliban regime from power in Afghanistan. Just after the commencement of the invasion of Afghanistan, the United Nations sponsored an international conference in Bonn, Germany, with Afghan anti-Taliban leaders to re-create the State of Afghanistan and form an interim government.

The Bonn Agreement established an Afghan Interim Authority which would be established upon the official transfer of power on 22 December 2001. The Interim Authority would consist of Interim Administration a Supreme Court of Afghanistan and a Special Independent Commission for the Convening of an Emergency Loya Jirga (Grand Council). The Emergency Loya Jirga was to be held within 6 months after the establishing of the AIA and would put in place an Afghan Transitional Authority which would replace the Afghan Interim Authority. The Afghan Interim Administration, the most important part of the Interim Authority, would be composed of a chairman, five vice chairmen and 24 other members which each head a department of the Interim Administration. Also decided was that Hamid Karzai would be the chairman of the Interim Administration.

After the 2002 loya jirga concluded, the Interim Administration was replaced by a Transitional administration.

History

Negotiations in Bonn
Four delegations of anti-Taliban factions attended the Bonn Conference: the Northern Alliance or United Islamic Front; the "Cypress group," a group of exiles with ties to Iran; the "Rome group," loyal to former King Mohammad Zahir Shah, who lived in exile in Rome and did not attend the meeting; and the "Peshawar group," a group of mostly Afghan exiles based in Pakistan. At the time of the conference half of Afghanistan was in the hands of the Northern Alliance, including Kabul where Burhanuddin Rabbani had taken over the Presidential Palace and said that any talks on the future of Afghanistan should take place inside the country.

There was a lot of debate about who would lead the interim government. Rabbani did not want the Bonn Conference to decide on names for the interim government but after pressure from the United States and Russia the Northern Alliance delegation headed by younger leader Yunus Qanuni, decided to go on with the talks with or without the support of Rabbani.

At the beginning of the conference it seemed that King Zahir Shah had a lot of support, but the Northern Alliance opposed this. By the final days of the conference, it was down to two candidates: Hamid Karzai, whom the United States was promoting as a viable candidate and Abdul Satar Sirat, whose name was proposed by the Rome group. The Bonn conference agreed that Karzai would head the Interim Administration.

Creation of the cabinet
With Karzai chosen as "Chairman" of the Interim Administration, he created a 30-member cabinet. The Northern Alliance received about half of the posts in the interim cabinet, and members of the Rome group were named to eight positions. These included warlords with private militias. Among the most notable members of the interim administration were the trio Yunus Qanuni, Mohammad Fahim and Abdullah Abdullah, three of the most well-known leaders of the Northern Alliance. Afghanistan had been in a state of serious fragmentation and factionalism since the early 1990s; Karzai attempted to unify the country by working with and representing all four major ethnic groups in the cabinet. The inclusion of different warlords in the cabinet (and appointment to high provincial positions) divided opinion in Afghanistan, but many saw it as an attempt by Karzai to include everyone in a post-Taliban era of Afghanistan to prevent further conflict.

During the time in power of the administration, clashes between certain warlords did occur, notably ethnic clashes between followers of Abdul Rashid Dostum and Atta Muhammad Nur in northern Afghanistan (their rift would continue until c. 2003), and factional clashes between the militias of Pacha Khan Zadran and rivals including Taj Mohammad Wardak in Paktia and Khost provinces. Karzai's administration in Kabul did not always have power in the regions where warlords were battling.

Composition of Afghan Interim Administration

References

External links
 Frontline report of Bonn Conference
 Who is who in Afghanistan

Former political entities in Afghanistan
Executive branch of the government of Afghanistan
2000s in Afghanistan
Provisional governments
Hamid Karzai
History of Afghanistan (1992–present)
Government agencies established in 2001
Government agencies disestablished in 2002
2001 establishments in Afghanistan
2002 disestablishments in Afghanistan
Afghanistan conflict (1978–present)